David Alexander Colville,  LL. D. (24 August 1920 – 16 July 2013) was a painter and printmaker who continues to achieve both popular and critical success.

Early life and war artist 

Born in 1920 in Toronto, Ontario, Colville moved with his family at age seven to St. Catharines, and then to Amherst, Nova Scotia, in 1929. He attended Mount Allison University from 1938 to 1942, where he studied under Canadian Post-Impressionists like Stanley Royle and Sarah Hart, graduating with a Bachelor of Fine Arts.

Colville married Rhoda Wright, who he had been friends with since his first year at "Mount A," in 1942 and enlisted in the Canadian Army shortly afterwards. He enlisted in the infantry, eventually earning the rank of lieutenant. He painted in Yorkshire and took part in the Royal Canadian Navy's landings in southern France. He was then attached to the 3rd Canadian Division. After being in the army for two years, and because he was a fine-arts student, he was made a war artist in May 1944. His unit relieved the 82nd Airborne Division at Nijmegen, Netherlands in mid-September 1944 during Operation Market Garden and remained there until the following February. He continued on to tours in the Netherlands and Germany, where he was also tasked with depicting the horrors of the Bergen-Belsen concentration camp. Colville's painting Bodies in a Grave (1946), a scene of emaciated corpses in a Bergen-Belsen burial pit, is based on images he captured with his army-issue camera at the concentration camp.

Career 
Colville had some success while still enrolled at Mount Allison, exhibiting at the Art Association of Montreal (now the Montreal Museum of Fine Arts) in 1941, and the Royal Canadian Academy of Arts in 1942. After the war, Colville returned to New Brunswick and became a faculty member with the Fine Arts Department at Mount Allison University, where he taught from 1946 to 1963. Colville is often cited as belonging to the Magic Realism movement, and within this he developed his own style that influenced both a regional and national art community, as teacher and founder of what would become known as Maritime Realism. By contrast to other members of the Maritime school, the composition of his work involved geometry. Often too, in his later work, he seized on the fugitive moment, imagining a hypothetical "What if" something happened in the conscious world.

Maritime Realism came to fruition during the apex of abstract painting's ascendancy both nationally and internationally. Colville influenced a host of students that pursued a realist painting style. Norman Eastman (class of 1952), Hugh Mackenzie (class of 1953), Tom Forrestall (class of 1958), Christopher Pratt (class of 1961) Mary Pratt (class of 1961), Daniel Brown (class of 1961), Nancy Stevens (class of 1962), Ken Tomlie (class of 1962), Roger Savage (class of 1963), Suzanne Hill (class of 1964), Glenn Adams (class of 1965), and Don Pentz (class of 1966).

He left teaching to devote himself to painting and print-making full-time from a studio in his home on York Street; this building is now named Colville House.

In 1966, works by Colville along with those of Yves Gaucher and Sorel Etrog represented Canada at the Venice Biennale. In 1967, Colville was made an Officer of the Order of Canada, elevated to Companion in 1982, the order's highest level. In 1973, the University of Windsor gave him an honorary doctor of laws.

Colville's wife served as the model for a number of his celebrated works. Rhoda Colville's recreational life as a swimmer, skater, dancer, singer, pianist and cyclist was featured in her husband's pieces, often set in the landscapes and waterways of Annapolis Valley.

Colville lived in St. Catharines, Ontario, for three years before moving to Nova Scotia. In 1973, he moved his family to his wife's hometown of Wolfville, where they lived and worked in the house that her father built and in which she was born. The Colvilles had three sons, a daughter, and eight grandchildren.

In contrast to many of his contemporaries, Colville aligned himself with the Progressive Conservative Party of Canada and was a card-carrying party member for many years. In 1981 he was appointed chancellor of Nova Scotia's Acadia University serving in that role until 1991.

Death 
Colville died on 16 July 2013 at his house in Wolfville at the age of 92 of a heart condition. His wife Rhoda Wright died on 29 December 2012.  They are survived by three of their four children, Graham, Charles, and Ann. Their second son, John, died on 22 February 2012.

Exhibitions 

Colville exhibited extensively across Canada and internationally including at the Tate Gallery in London and the Beijing Exhibition Centre in Beijing. In 1983, an international touring retrospective of his work was organized by the Art Gallery of Ontario. In 2003, The Art Gallery of Nova Scotia organized an exhibition titled Alex Colville: Return curated by Tom Smart. In 2014, the Art Gallery of Ontario organized Alex Colville, the largest exhibition of the artist's work to date.

Alex Colville's work is found in many collections including the Owens Art Gallery at Mount Allison University.  The Owens also maintains Colville House, the private home of Colville which acts as an exhibit space for his work.  Colville's work can also be found in the Art Gallery of Nova Scotia, the Cape Breton University Art Gallery in Sydney, Nova Scotia, the New Brunswick Museum, Saint John, the Museum of Modern Art in New York, the Musée National d'Art Moderne in Paris, the National Gallery of Canada in Ottawa, the Centre National d'Art et de Culture Georges Pompidou in Paris, the Wallraf-Richartz Museum in Cologne and the Kestnergesellschaft in Hanover, Germany.

Notable works

Infantry, near Nijmegen, Holland 

Trained as an infantry officer, he did a painting when World War II ended. Based upon numerous drawings, it was called Infantry and is now in the Canadian War Museum. It represents a platoon of Canadian soldiers spread out and marching along both sides of a road. Colville believed it conveyed his perception of war, as both heroism and enduring persistence among nature's elements and constant danger. The face of the first man is actually a portrait of the artist's father.

Horse and Train 

This 1954 work was inspired by two lines from the poet Roy Campbell:

Against a regiment I oppose a brain
And a dark horse against an armored train.

Horse and Train is a part of the Art Gallery of Hamilton's permanent collection; Dominion Foundries and Steel, Ltd. (Dofasco Inc) donated the painting in 1957. It appears on the cover of the album Night Vision by Bruce Cockburn. Alex Colville and Horse and Train are mentioned in the introduction (and in the story itself) of Nova Scotia fiction writer Barry Wood's short story Nowhere to Go published in England's Postscripts #14 in 2008.
The painting can also be seen in the film The Shining (1980) where it can be seen hanging in a hallway during the doctor's visit.

To Prince Edward Island 
This 1965 painting is perhaps his best-known work. It features a woman depicted looking through binoculars, in the direction of the artist. Colville describes this work as an exploration of "the searching vision of the female" contrasted with the "stupid and passive" man, who she occludes. "The woman sees, I suppose, and the man does not." To Prince Edward Island is referenced in Korean Canadian artist Jin-me Yoon's series Long View (2017), specifically in the photograph Long View, #1, in which Yoon looks through a pair of binoculars.

The Circuit Rider 
His mural in Tweedie Hall at Mount Allison University, known officially as The History of Mount Allison or The Circuit Rider.

Pacific 
His 1967 painting Pacific, showing a man leaning against an open door looking out to sea while a Browning Hi-Power pistol rests on a table in the foreground, inspired one of the definitive scenes in the 1995 film Heat with actor Robert De Niro.

Man on Verandah 
Painted in 1953, its sale at auction for $1.287 million set a record for a work by a living Canadian artist. Part of the estate of the late G. Hamilton Southam (1918–2008), it was sold at an auction of Canadian post-war and contemporary art by Heffel Fine Art Auction House on 25 November 2010. Expected to get up to $600,000, the price inflated during a three-way bidding war between two Canadian phone bidders and a person at the auction.

List of selected works

Works in other media 

In 1965, Colville was commissioned to design the images on the Canadian 1867–1967 centennial commemorative coin set. The set consists of the following designs: Rock dove on 1 cent coin, rabbit on 5 cent coin, mackerel on 10 cent coin, lynx on 25 cent coin, wolf on 50 cent coin and goose on the 1 dollar coin.

On 22 March 2002 Canada Post issued 'Church and Horse, 1964, Alex Colville' in the Masterpieces of Canadian art series. The stamp was designed by Pierre-Yves Pelletier based on a painting Church and Horse (1964) by Alex Colville. The $1.25 stamps are perforated 13 X 13.5 and were printed by Ashton-Potter Limited.

See also 
 Canadian official war artists
 War artist
 Military art
 Trains in art

References

Further reading 
 Brandon, Laura. War Art in Canada: A Critical History. Toronto: Art Canada Institute, 2021. ISBN 978-1-4871-0271-5
 
Cronin, Ray. Alex Colville: Life & Work. Toronto: Art Canada Institute, 2017.

External links 

Alex Colville in the Canadian Encyclopedia

Official site of Canadian artist Alex Colville
The Essence of Magic Realism – Critical Study of the origins and development of Magic Realism in art.
Alex Colville fonds at the National Gallery of Canada, Ottawa, Ontario
Liliane and Cyril Welch fonds at the National Gallery of Canada, Ottawa, Ontario
Robert Boyer Inch fonds at the National Gallery of Canada, Ottawa, Ontario

1920 births
2013 deaths
20th-century Canadian painters
Canadian male painters
21st-century Canadian painters
20th-century Canadian printmakers
Companions of the Order of Canada
Members of the King's Privy Council for Canada
Members of the Order of Nova Scotia
Modern painters
Mount Allison University alumni
Academic staff of Mount Allison University
People from Cumberland County, Nova Scotia
Realist painters
Artists from Nova Scotia
Artists from Toronto
Canadian war artists
World War II artists
20th-century printmakers
Canadian contemporary artists
Canadian Army personnel of World War II
Military personnel from Toronto
Canadian Army officers
20th-century Canadian male artists
21st-century Canadian male artists